Bombyx lemeepauli is a species of Bombycidae in the genus Bombyx. It was described by Albert Marie Victor Lemée in 1950. It is found in Vietnam and China.

References

Moths described in 1950
Bombycidae